Lee Hsin-han and Yang Tsung-hua won the title, defeating Feng He and Zhang Ze 6–2, 7–6(7–4) in the final.

Seeds

Draw

Draw

References
 Main Draw

ATP China Challenger International - Doubles
2011 Doubles